Francis William Topham (Leeds 15 April 1808 – 31 March 1877 Córdoba) was an English watercolourist and engraver.

Life
His early in life he was articled to an uncle who was a writing engraver. Around 1830 he came to London, and at first found employment in engraving coats-of-arms. He then entered the service of Messrs. Fenner & Sears, engravers and publishers. Moving employment to James Sprent Virtue, he engraved landscapes after William Henry Bartlett and Thomas Allom.

Topham first visited Ireland in 1844 and 1845, with Frederick Goodall and Alfred Fripp. His career as watercolourist  appears to have started self-taught, helped by practice at the meetings of the Artists' Society in Clipstone Street. He was in 1850  one of Charles Dickens's company of actors (the "splendid strollers") in The Rent Day of Douglas Jerrold and Bulwer Lytton's Not so bad as we seem. Towards the end of 1852 he went for a few months to Spain in search of the picturesque.

In the winter of 1876 Topham again went to Spain, dying in Córdoba in 1877, and was buried in the Protestant cemetery there.

Works
Topham's earliest exhibited work was The Rustic's Meal, which appeared at the Royal Academy in 1832, and was followed in 1838, 1840, and 1841 by three paintings in oil-colours. In 1842 he was elected an associate of the New Society of Painters in Watercolours, of which he became a full member in 1843. He retired, however, in 1847, and in 1848 was elected a member of the (Old) Society of Painters in Watercolours, to which he contributed a Welsh view near Capel Curig, and a subject from the Irish ballad of Rory O'More. His earlier works consisted chiefly of representations of Irish peasant life and studies of Wales and her people. These were diversified in 1850 by a scene from Dickens' Barnaby Rudge. 

Topham also made designs for Fisher, Son & Co.'s edition of the Waverley Novels, some of which he engraved. He drew on the wood illustrations for Pictures and Poems, 1846, Mrs. S. C. Hall's Midsummer Eve, 1848, Robert Burns's Poems, Thomas Moore's ‘'Melodies and Poems, Dickens's ‘'A Child's History of England, and other works.

The earliest of Topham's Spanish subjects appeared in 1854, when he exhibited Fortune Telling — Andalusia, and Spanish Gypsies 29,5 x 38,5 cm. These paintings were followed by The Andalusian Letter-Writer and The Posada in 1855, Spanish Card-players and Village Musicians in Brittany in 1857, Spanish Gossip in 1859, and others, mainly Spanish. In the autumn of 1860 he paid a return visit to Ireland, and in 1861 exhibited The Angel's Whisper and Irish Peasants at the Holy Well. In 1864 he began to exhibit Italian drawings, sending Italian Peasants and The Fountain at Capri, and in 1870 A Venetian Well.  

Four of Topham's drawings, Galway Peasants, Irish Peasant Girl at the foot of a Cross, Peasants at a Fountain, Basses-Pyrénées, and South Weald Church, Essex, went to the South Kensington Museum. Several of his drawings were engraved:

The Spinning Wheel and The Sisters at the Holy Well, by Francis Holl;
Irish Courtship, by F. W. Bromley; 
Making Nets, by Thomas Oldham Barlow; 
The Mother's Blessing, by William Henry Simmons; and 
The Angel's Whisper, for The Art Journal of 1871, by C. W. Sharpe.

Family
While with Fenner & Sears, Topham met Henry Beckwith the engraver, and married his sister Mary Anne Beckwith in 1832. They had ten children. Their son Frank William Warwick Topham (1838–1924) became known as a painter.

Notes

External links

, engraved by G Presbury for Fisher's Drawing Room Scrap Book, 1839 with a poetical illustration by Letitia Elizabeth Landon.

Attribution

1808 births
1877 deaths
19th-century English painters
English male painters
English engravers
English watercolourists
19th-century English male artists